Aero Contractors Ltd., a private charter company based in Smithfield, North Carolina, is said by some to provide discreet air transport services for the Central Intelligence Agency (CIA).

The company was founded in 1979 by Jim Rhyne, a former pilot with Air America. The company has 26 planes and 79 employees and operates from the tiny Johnston Regional Airport.

On May 31, 2005, The New York Times reported that the company was heavily involved in extraordinary rendition, the transport of terrorism suspects to countries where they can be interrogated to extract information. An Aero Contractors plane was used in the transport of Khalid El-Masri, a German citizen who was pulled from a bus on the Serbia-Macedonia border and held for three weeks. He was drugged and beaten before being flown to Afghanistan on a Boeing Business Jet operated by Aero Contractors. El-Masri was released after five months.

Aero Corporations allegedly operates under several different shell companies, including Stevens Express Leasing, Inc., Premier Executive Transport Services, Aviation Specialties, Inc., Aero LLC (Wyoming) and Devon Holding and Leasing, Inc.

A book published in September 2006, Torture Taxi: On the Trail of the CIA Rendition Flights includes many details about Aero Contractors' involvement in extraordinary rendition.

In September 2018, the North Carolina Commission of Inquiry on Torture released a report entitled Torture Flights: North Carolina’s Role in the CIA Rendition and Torture Program which detailed the history of the airport's activities with the rendition, detention and interrogation and the suggested CIA shell companies involved. The report is available on their website format.

See also
 List of defunct airlines of the United States
Jeppesen
Rendition aircraft
Tepper Aviation

References

External links
Youtube video of protest at Aero Contractors, March 18, 2007
 Johnston County Airport
NCCIT

Airlines established in 1979
Companies based in North Carolina
Central Intelligence Agency front organizations
Defunct airlines of the United States
Airlines based in North Carolina